Kevin Peter Curran (3 October 1919 – 14 February 1986) was an Australian rules footballer who played with Richmond in the Victorian Football League (VFL).

Notes

External links 

1919 births
1986 deaths
Australian rules footballers from Victoria (Australia)
Richmond Football Club players